Kerida Naidoo is an Irish lawyer who has been a judge of the High Court since February 2022. He was formerly a barrister.

Early life 
Naidoo obtained a BA from Trinity College Dublin and attended the King's Inns. He was the auditor of the College Historical Society between 1990 and 1991. He appeared on the RTÉ TV series Challenging Times representing the King's Inns in 1994.

Legal career 
He was called to the Irish Bar in 1995 and became a senior counsel in 2015. He was heavily involved in criminal trials, appearing for the prosecution and for defendants.

He was counsel for the Director of Public Prosecutions in cases involving murder, health and safety offences, sexual offences, weapons offences, kidnap, robbery, and drugs offences. Naidoo was the prosecuting barrister in the trial of a man convicted of vandalising Argenteuil Basin with a Single Sailboat. He appeared for the DPP in the first prosecution of the offence of coercive control in Ireland. He acted for the Office of the Director of Corporate Enforcement in High Court proceedings connected with its investigation into the Football Association of Ireland.

He defended county councillor Kieran Mahon in his trial for the false imprisonment of Joan Burton, where the jury returned a not guilty verdict.

He was a member of a working group on judicial review from 2001 for the Law Reform Commission.

Judicial career 
Naidoo was nominated to become a judge of the High Court in January 2022. He was appointed in February 2022.

References

Living people
High Court judges (Ireland)
Alumni of Trinity College Dublin
Alumni of King's Inns
Year of birth missing (living people)
Irish barristers